William and Caroline Schall House is a historic home located at Green Lane, Montgomery County, Pennsylvania. It was built about 1835, and is a -story, five bay, "L"-shaped stone dwelling with an open, two-story porch in the Federal style.  A Colonial Revival style portico was added to the front facade about 1925.  Also on the property is a contributing stucco covered wash house, also built about 1835.

It was added to the National Register of Historic Places in 2007.

References

Houses on the National Register of Historic Places in Pennsylvania
Federal architecture in Pennsylvania
Houses completed in 1835
Houses in Montgomery County, Pennsylvania
National Register of Historic Places in Montgomery County, Pennsylvania